Porta Garibaldi is a district (quartier) of Milan, Italy. It is an area located within Zone 9 of the city.

See also
Porta Garibaldi (Milan city gate)

Districts of Milan